Cristian Hernán Díaz (born 16 May 1989) is an Argentine professional footballer who plays as a right-back for Mitre.

Career
Díaz's career began with Newell's Old Boys, with the defender's first professional appearance arriving on 3 July 2009 during a defeat to Racing Club. Fifty-five further appearances followed for the Argentine Primera División club, prior to Díaz scoring his opening senior goal in a home win over Vélez Sarsfield in March 2014. A year later, in February 2015, Díaz was loaned out to fellow Primera División side Banfield. He returned to his parent club eleven months later after being selected twice by Banfield. On 9 January 2016, Díaz joined Primera B Nacional's Gimnasia y Esgrima. He scored two goals across thirty-eight appearances for them.

Torneo Federal A side Central Córdoba completed the signing of Díaz in 2017. He scored goals against Douglas Haig, Defensores de Pronunciamiento, Defensores de Belgrano and Chaco For Ever as the club won promotion as champions to the second tier in his first season.

Career statistics
.

Honours
Newell's Old Boys
Argentine Primera División: 2012–13 Torneo Final

Central Córdoba
Torneo Federal A: 2017–18

References

External links

1989 births
Living people
People from Constitución Department
Argentine footballers
Association football defenders
Argentine Primera División players
Primera Nacional players
Torneo Federal A players
Newell's Old Boys footballers
Club Atlético Banfield footballers
Gimnasia y Esgrima de Jujuy footballers
Central Córdoba de Santiago del Estero footballers
Club Atlético Mitre footballers
Sportspeople from Santa Fe Province